With Triumph Comes Loss is the third full-length release from the Swiss metalcore band Cataract, and also their first album signed to Metal Blade Records.

Track listing
"Killing Tool"
"Nothing's Left"
"Vanished in the Dark"
"Skies Grow Black"
"As We Speak"
"Godevil"
"Fuel"
"Reborn From Fire"
"Saving Shelter"
"Hallow Horns"
"With Triumph Comes Loss"

Personnel
Federico Carminitana - vocals
Simon Füllemann - guitar
Greg Mäder - guitar
Michael Henggeler - bass
Ricky Dürst - drums

References

2004 albums
Cataract (band) albums
Metal Blade Records albums
Albums produced by Tue Madsen